Cao Văn Lầu (1892–1976), also known as Sáu Lầu (Lầu the Sixth in Vietnamese), was a Vietnamese musician. He was the original composer of the song vong co which started a new genre of cai luong music in the 1920s.

He was born on 22 December 1892 in Long An province, French Cochinchina. At the age of 4, he moved to Bac Lieu and spent all his life there. In Bac Lieu, he studied Hán tự with a monk and then attended a French primary school. In 1907, Lau stopped schooling because of his poverty. In 1908, he began learning music from local musician Lê Tài Khí and began his music career four year later. In 1913, he married a woman named Trần Thị Tấn.

Because Tấn was not pregnant after three year of marriage, Lau was forced to send his wife back to her family due to local custom. This separation was inspired Cao Van Lau in comprising his best known love-song Dạ cổ hoài lang (Night Drum Beats Cause Longing for Absent Husband), a song that have a great influence in cải lương music. He died on August 13, 1976 in Bac Lieu.

References

External links
Ca Mau club spreads music rooted in native soil
Page with portrait of Cao Văn Lầu.

Vietnamese musicians
1892 births
1976 deaths
People from Bạc Liêu Province
People from Long An Province